The theology of Søren Kierkegaard has been a major influence in the development of 20th century theology.  Søren Kierkegaard (1813–1855) was a 19th-century Danish philosopher who has been generally considered the "Father of Existentialism".  During his later years (1848–1855), most of his writings shifted from philosophical in nature to religious.

Kierkegaard's theology focuses on the single individual in relation to a known God based on a subjective truth.  Many of his writings were a directed assault against all of Christendom, Christianity as a political and social entity.  His target was the Danish State Church, which represented Christendom in Denmark.  Christendom, in Kierkegaard's view, made individuals lazy in their religion.  Many of the citizens were officially "Christians", without having any idea of what it meant to be a Christian.  Kierkegaard attempted to awaken Christians to the need for unconditional religious commitment. However, he was also against party spirit in religion as well as other areas of study and system building.

Religious background

Kierkegaard
Søren Kierkegaard was born to a Lutheran Protestant family.  His father, Michael Pederson Kierkegaard, was a Lutheran Pietist, but he questioned how God could let him suffer so much.  One day, he climbed a mountain and cursed God.  For this sin, Michael believed that a family curse was placed upon him, that none of his children would live a full life.  And indeed, Kierkegaard's family suffered with early deaths of Søren's siblings, ranging from childbirth to the age of 25.  Only Søren and his brother Peter survived past 25.  His father died in 1838, but before his death, he asked Søren to become a pastor.  Søren was deeply influenced by his father's religious experience and life, and felt obligated to fulfill his wish.  In 1840, Søren was awarded his theology degree and although Søren was eligible to become a pastor, he decided to pursue a degree in philosophy instead.

He decided not to become a pastor or a professor either because if he had he would have had to write under the authority of the State or the Church. He craved freedom, and for that reason he wrote "without authority". He also believed in Christ as the ultimate authority in matters of personal faith. He was against beginning a "new religion", unlike Hegel, the religion of reason, and Schelling, the religion of nature. He always wrote to students of religion as a student of religion. J. Loewenberg of Harvard University described Hegel's God in the following terms in 1913:  as Hegel puts his fundamental idea, “the truth is the whole.” Neither things nor categories, neither histories nor religion, neither sciences nor arts, express or exhaust by themselves the whole essence of the universe. The essence of the universe is the life of the totality of all things, not their sum. As the life of man is not the sum of his bodily and mental functions, the whole man being present in each and all of these, so must the universe be conceived as omnipresent in each of its parts and expressions. This is the significance of Hegel’s conception of the universe as an organism. The World-Spirit-Hegel’s God-constitutes, thinks, lives, wills, and is all in unity. The evolution of the universe is thus the evolution of God himself. The task of philosophy, then, as Hegel conceives it, is to portray in systematic form the evolution of the World-Spirit in all its necessary ramifications.The Life of George Wilhelm Friedrich Hegel, p. 13-14
Søren Kierkegaard questioned this evolution of God because if God is evolving in a systematic way then the awe and wonder of religion is replaced with speculations about where God is in relation to the system about God.What does the task look like in everyday life, for I continually have my favorite theme in mind: whether everything is indeed all right with the craving of our theocentric nineteenth century to go beyond Christianity, the craving to speculate, the craving for continued development, the craving for a new religion or for the abolition of Christianity. As for my own insignificant person, the reader will please recall that I am the one who finds the issue and the task so very difficult, which seems to suggest that I have not carried it out, I, who do not even pretend to be a Christian by going beyond it. But it is always something to point out that it is difficult, even if it is done, as it is here, only in an upbuilding divertissement, which is carried out essentially with the aid of a spy whom I have go out among people on weekdays, and with the support of a few dilettantes who against their will come to join in the game." Søren Kierkegaard, Concluding Unscientific Postscript (1846) p. 466, Hong

This "going beyond faith" for Kierkegaard means the same as going beyond oneself. Philosophers, theologians, historians, and anthropologists tend to go beyond themselves and apply what they learn to the course of world history or national history. In this view we come to a Christian nation or a Christian world, but Søren Kierkegaard felt that God comes into the single individual, and that's where the place of God is. It's not "out there" somewhere. This point was brought home by Kierkegaard in his 1845 book, Thoughts on Crucial Situations in Human Life and in 1960 by Ronald Gregor Smith in his book, J G Hamann 1730-1788 A Study In Christian Existence,

Denmark and Europe
Kierkegaard accused Christian religious institutions of not being genuinely religious.  Intellectual scholarship in Christianity was becoming more and more like Hegelianism, which he called Christian "evolution", rather than Christianity.  This made the scholars of religion and philosophy examine the Gospels from a supposedly higher objective standpoint in order to demonstrate how correct reasoning can reveal an objective truth.  This was outrageous to Kierkegaard because this presupposed that an infinite God and his infinite wisdom could be grasped by finite human understanding.  Kierkegaard believed that Christianity was not a doctrine to be taught, but rather a life to be lived. He considered that many Christians who were relying totally on external proofs of God were missing out a true Christian experience, which is precisely the relationship one individual can have with God.

Kierkegaard's audience
Kierkegaard's primary religious audience was Christian readers, especially those who did not fully grasp what Christianity was all about.  It was not his intention to convert non-Christians to Christianity, although much of Kierkegaard's religious writings do appeal to some non-Christian readers.   For example, Martin Buber was a Jewish existentialist theologian who critiqued many of Kierkegaard's ideas.

Kierkegaard delivered religious discourses because he didn't become a theologian or a philosopher of religion. His audience was any single individual who is laboring to become what God wants him to become.  

Striving can be done for the individual goal of becoming famous or just striving to make a living and the hope to have a future. Kierkegaard writes about the "divinely appointed teachers" of what it means to be a human being. And Christ is the prototype for what it means to be a human being from Kierkegaard's point of view. He put it this way in his Upbuilding Discourses in Various Spirits (1847): 

He wrote for individuals who struggle with sin and forgiveness and he began this in Either/Or (1843) and continued through 1851 with a repetition of his theme from his three discourse of 1843 Love Will Hide a Multitude of Sins. He sees the spiritual connection between God and the single individual much akin to Luther's idea of the priesthood of all believers.

Themes in his theology

Faith
Faith is a hallmark of Kierkegaardian philosophical and religious thought. Two of his key ideas are based on faith: the leap to faith and the knight of faith. Some regard Kierkegaard as a Christian Universalist, writing in his journals, "If others go to Hell, I will go too. But I do not believe that; on the contrary, I believe that all will be saved, myself with them—something which arouses my deepest amazement." However, this view is not always supported by Kierkegaard's own writings. He presupposes the individual who has decided to become a Christian has an interest in becoming that, is interested enough to attempt to develop a relationship with Christ, and has enough faith to believe that the possibility extends to all individuals equally. Faith is what makes each individual equal before God. He put it this way in his Four Upbuilding Discourses 1844 (Against Cowardliness). 

He wrote the following in his 1846 book, Concluding Unscientific Postscript:
Although an outsider, I have at least understood this much, that the only unforgivable high treason against Christianity is the single individual’s taking his relation to it for granted. I must therefore most respectfully refuse all theocentric helpers and the assistance of helper’s helpers to help me into Christianity in that way. So I prefer to remain where I am, with my infinite interest, with the issue, with the possibility. In other words, it is not impossible that the individual who is infinitely interested in his own eternal happiness can some day become eternally happy; on the other hand, it is certainly impossible that the person who has lost a sense for it (and such a sense can scarcely be anything but an infinite concern) can become eternally happy. Indeed, once lost, it is perhaps impossible to regain it. Page 16

And reinforced the same idea in his 1850 book, Practice in Christianity: 

Faith, for Kierkegaard, was more than intellectual understanding. He began his great book Either/Or with a quotation from Edward Young, "Is reason then alone baptized, are the passions pagans?" and later explained what he meant in his Unscientific Postscript to Philosophical Fragments, which Rollo May called "the declaration of independence for existentialism". Intellect is important but not all-inclusive in the realm of religion. "A" in Either/Or wanted to use the arts to teach Christianity. "B" wanted to use the science of ethics to teach Christianity. Both can lead to an intellectual understanding devoid of passionate involvement in the act of becoming a Christian.

Richard McKeon (1900–1985) thought the imitators of Plato had misapplied his ideas and left the passions out of philosophy in favor of intellectualism. He wrote the following in his 1953 book Thought, Action, and Passion: 

The Young Man in Repetition was mediated by his psychologist, Constantin Constantius, as he tried to solve his problem. They represent the intellectual side of the human being and Abraham in Fear and Trembling represented the passion of inwardness because he was alone with God. Abraham believed in the actuality of God and could say nothing either artistically or ethically about it. Yet neither the Young Man nor Abraham is the prototype for the Christian, because the Christian is to follow Christ as the example.

Paradox
Briefly stated, a paradox is an apparently true statement or group of statements that seems to lead to a contradiction or to a situation that defies intuition.  It is said to be resolved when we show that the contradiction is only apparent.  Kierkegaard's story of Abraham in Fear and Trembling exhibits such a paradox.  Abraham could not prove he had heard the voice of God, yet he believes, and risked his only son based on this belief.  The paradox of Abraham is that the believer acts and risks much on less than complete knowledge (incomplete knowledge is not sufficient for faith for Kierkegaard; one must believe by virtue of the absurd, that is to say because something is a contradiction). The god in time is a paradox just as much as the statement that "God is love" is a parody for an individual existing in time. Was it so easy for Abraham, Job, and the Apostle Paul to continue to believe that God is love? Kierkegaard continually stresses the tension between the inner and outer self before God. What a human being knows by himself about love is very superficial; he must come to know the deeper love from God-that is, in self-denial he must become what every human being can become (since self-denial is related to the universally human and thus is distinguished from the particular call and election), an instrument for God. Thus every human being can come to know everything about love, just as every human being can come to know that he, like every human being, is loved by God. Some find this thought adequate for the longest life (which doesn’t seem surprising to me); so even at the age of seventy they do not think that they have marveled over it enough, whereas others find this thought so insignificant (which seems to me very strange and deplorable), since to be loved by God is no more than every human being is-as if it were, therefore, less significant.

The work of praising love must be done outwardly in self-sacrificing unselfishness. Through self-denial a human being gains the ability to be an instrument by inwardly making himself into nothing before God. Through self-sacrificing unselfishness he outwardly makes himself into nothing, an unworthy servant. Inwardly he does not become self-important, since he is nothing, and outwardly he does not become self-important either, since he is nothing before God – and he does not forget that right where he is he is before God.

Alas, it can happen that a person makes a mistake at the last moment, in that he, though truly humble before God, becomes proud of what he is able to do as he turns toward people. It is then a temptation of comparison that becomes his downfall. He understood that he could not compare himself to God; before him he became conscious of himself as a nothing; but in comparison with people he still thought himself to be something. That is, he forgot the self-denial; he is trapped in an illusion, as if he were before God only during specific hours, just as one has an audience with His Royal Majesty at a specific hour. 
Soren Kierkegaard, Works of Love 1847, Hong 1995 p. 364-365

Isaac was "the whole world" to Abraham and God had just introduced Abraham to the notion of "the soul". Was Abraham willing to give up the whole world in order to save his soul? Kierkegaard dealt with this question in Either/Or in this way: "The Bible says: For what would it profit a person if he gained the whole world but damaged his own soul; what would he have in return? Scripture does not state the antithesis to this, but it is implicit in the sentence. The antitheses would read something like this: What damage would there be to a person if he lost the whole world and yet did not damage his soul; what would he need in return?" This question brings Abraham to despair. Abraham was used as a prototype in Fear and Trembling and The Young Man was his counterpoint in Repetition. Abraham followed the inner voice without mediation from his wife, Sarah, his servant, or Isaac. He just heard and obeyed. The Young Man made a promise and wanted to change his mind. He consulted with a psychologist who was engaged in trying to prove the theory of eternal return. Then he appealed to Job and complained not only to the world but also to God himself. Abraham's love of God never changed but The Young Man's love for his fiancé was ever changing. Change was the theme of Kierkegaard's Three Upbuilding Discourses of 1843. These three books were published on the same day and should be considered together.

The paradox and the absurd are ultimately related to the Christian relationship with Christ, the God-Man. That God became a single individual and wants to be in a relationship with single individuals, not to the masses, was Kierkegaard's main conflict with the nineteenth-century church. The single individual can make and keep a resolution. Those who aren't interested in becoming a Christian claim they can't understand Christianity and quite often they will point to historical events to justify their position. Kierkegaard is against basing Christian belief solely on external events because it leads to doubt since externals are in constant flux. Doubt leads to speculation and this detracts from the single individual making a decision to imitate Christ. He wanted to be known as the philosopher of the internal and was against scientific proofs of Christianity through history, anthropology, and philosophy and the creation of systematic theology. Becoming a Christian is a decision to be made in time, just like becoming good is a decision/resolution made in time, and not just for consideration because the individual offers the "self" to God.

Kierkegaard said Socrates was his teacher and that Christ was his Teacher. (See Philosophical Fragments) 

This Christian belief in the absurd notion that God became man separates one from the world in such a way that the Christian is estranged from the world. The world believes that reason guides all our actions, or should, and can't accept Christianity and is therefore offended and the Christian can't accept the reason of the world and is therefore offended by the world. Kierkegaard put it this way in his Attack Upon Christendom:

Despair and sin
According to Kierkegaard, the self is freedom. Not simply the freedom to choose, but the freedom to create choices for oneself. Therefore, human beings are fundamentally neither their thoughts nor their feelings but rather they are themselves. The self relates directly to itself and is subject to no one and everyone at the same time. Yet this self is that which is in relation to his body and his soul in Kierkegaard's view. The spirit constitutes the relationship in which the self is established in totality by and unto God, and unto his body and soul. His body is his being in the world, his actions and outworked decisions, and his soul is his self-conception (that which determines his actions), and his spirit is the self which relates the soul and the body, and therefore itself, to God. In effect, when a person does not come to a full consciousness of himself or herself, then he or she is said to be in despair. Just like a physician might say that no one is completely healthy, it follows that human beings must despair at certain moments in their lives. To be in despair is to reflect upon the self. If someone does not engage in the art of despair, then he or she shall become stuck in a state of inertia with no effective progression or regression and that is the worst state of all.

Kierkegaard calls sickness, the sickness of the spirit. He wrote the following in Concluding Unscientific Postscript in 1846. 

Kierkegaard asked sharp questions that can only be answered by the "single individual" him or her self. This is an example from his 1847 book, Upbuilding Discourses in Various Spirits where he speaks of the third person and the crowd.:

Sin is separation from God but despair over sin is separation again. Kierkegaard said, "The consciousness of sin definitely belongs to the consciousness of the forgiveness of sin." Why would someone sit and reflect on sin to such an extent that an eternal happiness is exchanged for an eternal unhappiness or even a temporal unhappiness? This reflection is done in time but the consequence of the reflection leads one to lose hope in the possibility of any good coming from oneself. Kierkegaard says Christianity invites the single individual to become a partaker not only of the consciousness of sin but also of the consciousness of forgiveness but we seem to concentrate on the former to a remarkable degree. He said the following in Three Discourses on Imagined Occasions (1845) and Practice in Christianity (1850):

Christian doctrine
Kierkegaard believed that Christ was the originator of Christian doctrine and he had discussed some of the doctrinal points in his Eighteen Upbuilding Discourses. In these he discussed love, patience, equality, hope, and faith. It's easy to think you have faith but tougher to think your "neighbor" has faith. Kierkegaard made that point in his first Two Upbuilding Discourses, 1843. Therefore, faith is qualitatively different. It is not only the highest good, but it is a good in which all are able to share, and the person who rejoices in the possession of it also rejoices in the countless human race, “because what I possess.” He says, “every human being has or could possess.” The person who wishes it for another person wishes it for himself; the person who wishes it for himself wishes it for every other human being, because that by which another person has faith is not that by which he is different from him but is that by which he is like him; that by which he possesses it is not that by which he is different from others but that by which he is altogether like all. It was that kind of wish the perplexed man was seeking, one he could wish for another person with all his heart, with all his might, and with his whole soul, a wish he would dare to go on wishing, ever more fervently, even as his love became ever more fervent. –That was the wish that he would wish. 
 Soren Kierkegaard, Eighteen Upbuilding Discourses, Hong p. 10

Christianity has two parts, law and gospel, and Kierkegaard emphasized that Christ put an end to law with his law of love. "Just make the attempt, whether you find the sum that way no matter how long you go on counting, and you will see that it is useless labor, because the concept of the Law is to be inexhaustible, limitless, endless in its provisions; every provision begets of itself an even more precise provision, and in turn a still more precise provision by reference and in relation to the new provision, and so on infinitely. The relation of love to the Law is here like the relation of faith to understanding. The understanding counts and counts, calculates and calculates, but it never arrives at the certainty that faith possesses; in the same way the Law defines and defines but never arrives at the sum, which is love."

Loving the neighbor has a "double danger." The same with faith and hope. We not only wish that we could have love and peace but that our neighbor can have the same because it is a free gift from God. He nicely summed up the idea he had in his 1847 book Works of Love.

Selected religious works
 (1847) Edifying Discourses in Diverse Spirits
 (1847) Works of Love
 (1848) Christian Discourses
 (1848) The Book on Adler
 (1849) The Sickness Unto Death
 (1850) Training in Christianity
 (1851) For Self-Examination
 (1851) Judge for Yourselves!

References

Sources
Alexander Dru. The Journals of Søren Kierkegaard, Oxford University Press, 1938.
 Duncan, Elmer.  Søren Kierkegaard: Maker of the Modern Theological Mind, Word Books 1976, 
Joakim Garff. Søren Kierkegaard: A Biography, Princeton University Press 2005, .
 Hannay, Alastair and Gordon Marino (eds).  The Cambridge Companion to Kierkegaard, Cambridge University Press 1997, 
Alastair Hannay. Kierkegaard: A Biography, Cambridge University Press, New edition 2003, .

External links

 Edifying Discourses, by Soren Kierkegaard, translated by David F. Swenson, 1958
 Purity of Heart is to Will One Thing Translation of part one of Edifying Discourses in Various Spirits 1938 Douglas V. Steere
D. Anthony Storm's Commentary On Kierkegaard
Stanford Encyclopedia of Philosophy - Søren Kierkegaard
 Kierkegaard's attack upon "Christendom," 1854-1855 Princeton University Press (1946) Retrieved May 18, 2012

Universidad Iberoamericana - Kierkegaard en español

Kierkegaard
Søren Kierkegaard
Kierkegaard